Harry Anselm Clinch (October 27, 1908 – March 8, 2003) was an American prelate of the Roman Catholic Church. He served as bishop of the Diocese of Monterey in California from 1967 to 1982. He previously served as an auxiliary bishop of the Diocese of Monterey-Fresno from 1956 to 1967.

Biography

Early life and education 
Harry Clinch was born on October 27, 1908, in San Anselmo, California, to Henry Joseph and Mary E. (née McLoughlin) Clinch. In 1915, he moved with his family to Fresno, where he attended John Muir Elementary School and Fresno High School (1924–1925).

In 1925, Clinch was accepted by Bishop John MacGinley as a seminarian for the Diocese of Monterey-Fresno. He entered St. Benedict's Seminary in Atchison, Kansas, with a grant from the Students Endowment Fund established by the Catholic Church Extension Society. He attended St. Joseph's College in Mountain View from 1928 to 1930, and St. Patrick's Seminary in Menlo Park from 1930 to 1936.

Priesthood 
Clinch was ordained to the priesthood for the Diocese of Monterey-Fresno by Bishop Philip Scher on June 6, 1936. He was diocesan director of the Society for the Propagation of the Faith from 1936 to 1948. In 1937, he founded and became director of Santa Teresita Camp, the diocesan summer camp for children in Three Rivers, California. He also served as diocesan director of the Catholic Youth Organization (1939–1940), a chaplain at St. Agnes Hospital (1942–1946), and dean of Kern and Inyo Counties.

From 1941 to 1948, Clinch was editor of the diocesan newspaper, Central California Register. He received his first assignment as a pastor in 1946 at Our Lady of Perpetual Help Parish in Clovis, California, where he remained for two years. In 1948, Clinch became the founding pastor of Sacred Heart Parish in Fresno, California. At Sacred Heart, he constructed a church and established a parochial school.

Clinch was appointed pastor of St. Mary's Parish in Taft, California, in 1948. He was elevated by Pope Pius XII to the rank of domestic prelate in October 1952. In 1958, Clinch was assigned to the Carmel Mission Basilica in Carmel-by-the-Sea, California.

Auxiliary Bishop of Monterey-Fresno 
On December 5, 1956, Clinch was appointed as an auxiliary bishop of the Diocese of Monterey-Fresno and titular bishop of Badiae by Pius XII. He received his episcopal consecration on February 27, 1957, from Bishop Aloysius Willinger, with Bishops Timothy Manning and Merlin Guilfoyle serving as co-consecrators. He was the thirteenth native Californian to become a Catholic bishop. As an auxiliary bishop, he continued to serve at the Carmel Mission Basilica. Clinch attended all four sessions of the Second Vatican Council in Rome between 1962 and 1965.

Bishop of Fresno 
Following the split of the Diocese of Monterey from the Diocese of Fresno, Clinch was named bishop of Monterey by Pope Paul VI on October 16, 1967. During his 14-year tenure, Clinch implemented the reforms of the Second Vatican Council, ordained 22 priests, and established five new parishes. In May 1969, he succeeded Cardinal John Wright as episcopal adviser to the National Catholic Laymen's Retreat Conference.

Resignation and legacy 
On January 19, 1982, Pope John Paul II accepted Clinch's resignation as bishop of the Diocese Monterey. He sold his house in Pebble Beach, California, and used the proceeds to establish the Bishop Harry A. Clinch Endowment Fund. Harry Clinch moved to a  retirement community in Santa Cruz, California, where he died on March 8, 2003, at age 94. At the time of his death, he was believed to be the last surviving American participant of the Second Vatican Council.

See also

References

1908 births
2003 deaths
People from San Anselmo, California
Saint Patrick's Seminary and University alumni
People from Carmel-by-the-Sea, California
Catholics from California
20th-century Roman Catholic bishops in the United States